The Austrian Student Aid Foundation (de: Österreichische Studentenförderungsstiftung) is the second largest carrier of student housing (de: Studentenheime (denomination in Austria) respectively Studentenwohnheime ( denomination in Germany)) in Austria.

It is a not-for-profit foundation serving the public good. home4students is the trademark of the foundation, which has 80 employees and administers 16 dormitories in Vienna, Graz, Salzburg, Klagenfurt and Innsbruck for around 2,000 students who live in various arrangements (rooms, flats, and flat-sharing communities).

History 

On 6 May 1958  the central committee of the Austrian Students' Association (de: Österreichischen Hochschülerschaft) decided to establish the Austrian Student Aid Foundation.

By official notification on 25 May 1959 the “Stiftungsbrief“ (letter of foundation) was approved by the authorities. On 9 July 1959 the constitutional meeting of the "Kuratorium" (Board of Trustees) of the Austrian Student Aid Foundation was held and thereby officially founded.

Objectives 

The objective of the foundation is to "actively support students and higher education all across Austria."  The foundations activities aim at students who

 at the time of their application, are registered with a university or are in their absolutorium,
 are Austrian citizens (this requirement was abrogated by decision of the "Kuratorium" (Board of Trustees)),
 have a successful progress at university
 are indigent.

The objective is to be fulfilled through

 providing affordable living space for underprivileged students
 the administration of living space
 the awarding of scholarships

Holdings

References

External links 
 Official Website of home4students - Austrian Student Aid Foundation

University and college residential buildings
Student organisations in Austria
Education in Austria
Foundations based in Austria
Non-profit organisations based in Austria